Larven "Caterpillar" was a Swedish snowmobile that was manufactured from the 1960s to the 1980s in Östersund. The rider had to wear skis as well. This was for steering the vehicle, since the machine itself only provided propulsion. The design was easy to stow in a car due its small size.

Two Larven machines were used in a dramatic chase scene in Bear Island, a 1979 film.

External links
 Swedish Larven club 
 Pictures at the Swedish Larven club website 

Snowmobile manufacturers
Tracked vehicles
Östersund